Theodore Baskin (born June 14, 1950) has been Principal Oboe of the Orchestre Symphonique de Montréal since 1980. Born in Detroit, MI, he studied oboe with Arno Mariotti while at Cass Technical High School and John de Lancie while at the Curtis Institute of Music. Prior to his employment in the Orchestre Symphonique de Montréal, he held posts in the Detroit Symphony Orchestra and the Auckland Symphonia. Additionally, from 2000 to 2002, he was Professor of Oboe at the Indiana University School of Music. Baskin has appeared as soloist in Canada, the United States, Japan, and New Zealand. In addition to the more than 70 recordings with the Orchestre Symphonique de Montréal and Maestro Charles Dutoit for London/Decca Records, he has recorded four Vivaldi concerti for Chandos Records with I Musici de Montreal and has participated in chamber recordings with Les vents de Montréal for the CBC, Analekta, and Atma labels. In 1989, Baskin traveled to Moscow to give the world premiere of the Concerto for Oboe and 16 Strings by Russian Composer Alexander Raskatov, and in 1994 he premiered the Concerto for Oboe and Orchestra by André Prévost, a prominent Quebec composer, with the Orchestre Symphonique de Montréal. He is currently Associate Professor of Oboe at the McGill University Schulich School of Music and a participant in numerous summer festivals as both a teacher and a performer. His wife, Karen, is a member of the Orchestre Symphonique de Montréal cello section.

External links
Orchestre Symphonique de Montréal
Allegra Chamber Music
McGill University

1950 births
Living people
Musicians from Detroit
Indiana University faculty
American classical oboists
Male oboists
Cass Technical High School alumni
Classical musicians from Michigan
Academic staff of McGill University